Eyecatcher may refer to:
 Eyecatcher (landscape), an object used to decorate a landscape
 Eyecatcher (television), a scene or illustration used to begin and end a commercial break in a Japanese television show